Nothomyia is a genus of flies in the family Stratiomyidae.

Species
Nothomyia alticola James, 1977
Nothomyia bicolor Hollis, 1963
Nothomyia borgmeieri (Lindner, 1933)
Nothomyia brevis (Bigot, 1887)
Nothomyia calopus Loew, 1869
Nothomyia dubia (Brauer, 1882)
Nothomyia elongoverpa Yang, Wei & Yang, 2012
Nothomyia fallax (Enderlein, 1921)
Nothomyia fasciatipennis (Lindner, 1935)
Nothomyia flavipes James, 1977
Nothomyia intensica (Curran, 1928)
Nothomyia longisetosa (Lindner, 1933)
Nothomyia lopesi (Lindner, 1935)
Nothomyia metallica (Wiedemann, 1830)
Nothomyia nigra James, 1942
Nothomyia parvicornis James, 1939
Nothomyia scutellata Loew, 1869
Nothomyia viridis Hine, 1911
Nothomyia woodruffi James, 1977
Nothomyia yunnanensis Yang, Wei & Yang, 2012

References

Stratiomyidae
Brachycera genera
Taxa named by Hermann Loew
Diptera of South America
Diptera of North America
Diptera of Asia
Diptera of Australasia